These are the official results of the women's 100 metres event at the 2007 World Championships in Athletics in Osaka, Japan. There were a total number of 74 participating athletes, with eight qualifying heats and the final held on Monday August 27.

Medalists

Records

Results

Heats
First 3 of each Heat qualifies (Q) plus the 8 fastest non-direct qualifiers (q) reached the Quarterfinals.

Heat 1

Heat 2

Heat 3

Heat 4

Heat 5

Heat 6

Heat 7

Heat 8

Quarterfinals
First 4 of each Quarterfinal qualified (Q) for the Semifinals.

Heat 1

Heat 2

Heat 3

Heat 4

Semifinals
First 4 of each Semifinal qualified (Q) for the final.

Heat 1

Heat 2

Final

References
 Results

100 meters
100 metres at the World Athletics Championships
2007 in women's athletics